The All-Ireland Senior Hurling Championship 1902 was the 16th series of the All-Ireland Senior Hurling Championship, Ireland's premier hurling knock-out competition.  Cork (Dungourney) won the championship, beating London 3-13 to 0-00 in the final.

Format

All-Ireland Championship

Semi-final: (2 matches) The four provincial representatives make up the semi-final pairings.  Two teams are eliminated at this stage while the two winning teams advance to the home final。

Home final: (1 match) The winners of the two semi-finals contest this game.  One team is eliminated while the winning team advances to the final.

Final: (1 match) The winners of the home final and London, who receive a bye to this stage of the championship, contest this game.  The winners are declared All-Ireland champions.

Results

Connacht Senior Hurling Championship

Final

Leinster Senior Hurling Championship

First round

Second round

Semi-final

Final

Munster Senior Hurling Championship

First round

Semi-finals

Final

Ulster Senior Hurling Championship

Final

All-Ireland Senior Hurling Championship

Semi-finals

Home final

Final

Championship statistics

Miscellaneous

 Derry win the Ulster championship for the first time.
 The newly opened Cork Athletic Grounds hosted the All-Ireland final for the first time.

References

Sources

 Corry, Eoghan, The GAA Book of Lists (Hodder Headline Ireland, 2005).
 Donegan, Des, The Complete Handbook of Gaelic Games (DBA Publications Limited, 2005).

1902